Devil crab may refer to:
Velvet crab, a crab of the Portunidae family
Zosimus aeneus, a crab of the Xanthidae family

See also
Deviled crab